Tomisław Tajner (born 1 January 1983) is a Polish former ski jumper who competed from 2001 to 2010. His best individual World Cup results were 24th in Titisee-Neustadt on 1 December 2001, and 24th in Engelberg on 22 December 2002. In team competitions his best result was seventh in Lahti on 2 March 2002.

At the 2002 Winter Olympics in Salt Lake City, Tajner finished sixth in the large hill team competition and 39th in the individual large hill competition. At the 2003 Ski Jumping World Championships in Val di Fiemme, he finished seventh in the large hill team competition and 36th in the individual large hill competition. At the 2002 Ski Flying World Championships in Harrachov, he finished 33rd in the individual event.

He is the son of Apoloniusz Tajner.

External links 

1983 births
Living people
Polish male ski jumpers
Olympic ski jumpers of Poland
Ski jumpers at the 2002 Winter Olympics
People from Cieszyn
Sportspeople from Silesian Voivodeship
21st-century Polish people